Nishada brunneipennis is a moth of the family Erebidae. It was described by George Hampson (British entomologist) in 1911. It is found on the Moluccas.

References

Lithosiina
Moths described in 1911